British West Africa was the collective name for British colonies in West Africa during the colonial period, either in the general geographical sense or the formal colonial administrative entity. British West Africa as a colonial entity was originally officially known as Colony of Sierra Leone and its Dependencies, then British West African Territories and finally British West African Settlements.

The United Kingdom held varying parts of these territories or the whole throughout the 19th century. From west to east, the colonies became the independent countries of The Gambia, Sierra Leone, Ghana and Nigeria. Until independence, Ghana was referred to as the Gold Coast.

Historical jurisdiction 

British West Africa constituted during two periods (17 October 1821, until its first dissolution on 13 January 1850, and again 19 February 1866, until its final demise on 28 November 1888) as an administrative entity under a governor-in-chief (comparable in rank to a governor-general), an office vested in the governor of Sierra Leone (at Freetown). 
 
The other colonies originally included in the jurisdiction were the Gambia and the British Gold Coast (modern Ghana). Also western Nigeria, eastern Nigeria and northern Nigeria were included.

Africa's present makeup includes Ghana, Sierra Leone, Gambia, Western Nigeria, Eastern Nigeria and Northern Nigeria. These countries and areas are artifacts of the post-colonial period, or what the Ghanaian writer Kwame Appiah dubs neo-colonialism.

British West Africa was originally founded at the urging of the prominent abolitionist Fowell Buxton, who felt that ending the Atlantic slave trade required some level of British control of the coastline. Development was solely based on modernization, and autonomous educational systems were the first step to modernising indigenous culture. Cultures and interests of indigenous peoples were ignored. A new social order, as well as European influences within schools and local traditions, helped mould British West Africa's culture. The British West African colonial school curriculum helped play a role in this. Local elites developed, with new values and philosophies, who changed the overall cultural development.

In terms of social issues with British West Africa; sex and race usually conflicted each other (Carina E. Ray called it the "White Wife Problem"). During British West Africa's history, interracial relations were frowned upon, and couples might be discriminated against. There were even certain policies that deported the wives of these relationships back to Britain and denied them access to any of these colonies.

Aftermath 
Even after its final dissolution, a single currency, the British West African pound, was in effect throughout the region—including Nigeria—from 1907 to 1962.

Nigeria gained independence in 1960. Sierra Leone was self-governing by 1958 and gained independence in 1961. Gambia gained independence in 1965. In 1954, the British Gold Coast was allowed by Britain to self-govern and in 1957, the Gold Coast was given independence from Britain, under the name Ghana.

See also 
British colonisation in Africa
British Togoland
Colonial Nigeria
Gambia Colony and Protectorate
Gold Coast (British colony)
Royal West African Frontier Force
Sierra Leone Colony and Protectorate
European colonisation in Africa
Brandenburger Gold Coast
Danish Gold Coast
Dutch Gold Coast
Portuguese Gold Coast
Swedish Gold Coast
Scramble for Africa
West Africa cricket team

References

External links 

 
Former British colonies and protectorates in Africa
History of West Africa
History of the Gambia
History of Ghana
History of Nigeria
History of Sierra Leone
States and territories established in the 1780s
States and territories disestablished in 1957
1787 establishments in the British Empire
1957 disestablishments in the British Empire
1957 disestablishments in Africa
1780s establishments in Africa